NCAS may refer to:

Organisations
 National Centre for Atmospheric Science, a UK research centre
 National Clinical Assessment Service, a body dealing with UK healthcare professionals
 National Consortium for Academics and Sports, a programme in the USA using sport to effect social change